Duets is the first collaboration album by English musician Elton John, released in 1993.

Duets was released on a single CD, a single cassette and also as a double vinyl LP in the UK, with a slightly different running order. It was initially a Christmas project of John's, but that soon grew into an album of its own (Elton John's Christmas Party). The live version of "Don't Let the Sun Go Down on Me" with George Michael, track number 15 on the album, had already become a UK/US No. 1 hit in 1991. This is one of only 3 albums released between 1983 and 2016 without John's regular guitar player, Davey Johnstone.

Chart performance
The album debuted at No. 7 in the UK. In the US, it was certified gold and platinum in January 1994 by the RIAA.

Track listing

CD edition

LP edition

Singles
Three singles were released from the album in Britain: "True Love" (with Kiki Dee, reached No. 2), "Don't Go Breaking My Heart" (with RuPaul, reached No. 7), and "Ain't Nothing Like the Real Thing" (with Marcella Detroit, reached No. 24).

Personnel
Elton John – piano, keyboards, Roland RD-1000 digital piano, vocals
Robert Ahwai – guitar (6)
Guy Babylon – keyboards (3)
Eddie Bayers – drums (7)
Louis Biancaniello – keyboards, synthesizer, programming (5)
Curt Bisquera – drums (1, 3)
Martin Bliss – guitar (15)
Kimberly Brewer – backing vocals (9)
Johnny Britt – backing vocals (12)
Ray Brown – bass guitar (14)
Kelli Bruce – backing vocals (7)
Robbie Buchanan – keyboards, programming (13)
Kathy Burdick – backing vocals (7)
Chris Cameron – keyboards (15)
Linda Campbell McCrary – backing vocals (10)
Bill Churchfield – horn (12)
David Clayton – keyboards (15)
Leonard Cohen – vocals (14)
Luis Conte – congas (12)
Jim Cox – Hammond organ (12, 14), piano (14)
Andraé Crouch - backing vocals (3)
Andraé Crouch Choir - backing vocals (3)
Sandra Crouch - backing vocals (3)
Danny Cummings – percussion (15)
P.M. Dawn – vocals (2)
Kiki Dee – vocals (5)
Marcella Detroit – vocals, guitar, harmonica (11)
Martin Ditcham – drums (6), percussion (6, 16)
Nathan East – bass guitar (1, 3)
Alan Estes – bells, tambourine, vibraphone (12)
Deon Estus – bass guitar (15)
Ricky Fataar – drums (13)
Lynne Fiddmont-Linsay – backing vocals (9)
Brandon Fields – tenor saxophone (13)
Connye Florence – backing vocals (7)
Malcolm Foster – bass guitar (16)
Paul Franklin – steel guitar (7)
Jim Gilstrap – backing vocals (12)
Mark Goldenberg – guitar (13)
Gary Grant – trumpet (3)
Ed Greene – drums (12)
Sandy Griffith – backing vocals (5)
Steve Grove – saxophone (12)
John Guerin – drums (14)
Andy Hamilton – saxophone (15)
Don Henley – vocals (4)
Jay Henry – backing vocals (15)
Jerry Hey – trumpet (3)
Dan Higgins – baritone saxophone (3)
Yvonne Hodges – backing vocals (7)
Dann Huff – electric guitar (7)
James "Hutch" Hutchinson – bass guitar (13)
Paul Jackson Jr. – guitar (12)
Danny Jacob – guitar (15)
Michelle Johnson – backing vocals (2)
Plas Johnson – saxophone (14)
Nik Kershaw – vocals  (8)
Herold Klosser – keyboards, programming (10)
Mike Knapp – Roland TB-303 bassline (10)
Gladys Knight – vocals (9)
Stephen Kupka – baritone saxophone (13)
k.d. lang – vocals (1)
Shirley Lewis – backing vocals (15)
Etyenne Lytel – keyboards (2)
Lynn Mabry – backing vocals (15)
Sylvan Marc – bass guitar (6)
Candi McKenzie – backing vocals (16)
George Michael – vocals (15)
Max Middleton – piano, keyboards (6)
Jonathan Moffett – drums (15)
Giorgio Moroder – programming (10)
Phil Naish – synthesizer (7)
Dean Parks – guitar (1, 3, 14, 16), lap steel guitar (14)
Derrick Perkins – programming (9)
Jamie Perkins – keyboards (16)
Phil Perry – backing vocals (12)
Joel Peskin – tenor saxophone (3)
Greg Phillinganes – piano (12)
Scott Plunkett – keyboards (4)
Don Potter – acoustic guitar (7)
Billy Preston – Hammond organ B3 (13)
Lon Price – saxophone (12)
Bonnie Raitt – vocals, slide guitar (13)
Chris Rea – vocals (6), steel guitar (6), guitar (6, 16)
Bill Reichenbach Jr. – trombone (3)
Michael Rhodes – bass guitar (7)
Little Richard – vocals, piano (3)
Claytoven Richardson – backing vocals (5)
John Robinson – drums (4)
Portia Neeley-Rolle – backing vocals (2)
RuPaul – vocals (10)
Corrado Rustici – mandolin (5)
Chuck Sabo – drums (11, 16)
Thomas Schobel – sequencer (10)
Beverley Skeete – backing vocals (16)
Greg Smith – saxophone (12)
Phil Spalding – bass guitar (11)
Neil Stubenhaus – bass guitar (4)
Mark Taylor – keyboards (16)
Michael Thompson – guitar (4)
Lee Thornburg – trombone, trumpet (12, 13)
Matthew Vaughan – programming (11)
Narada Michael Walden – arrangements and vocal arrangement (5)
Freddie Washington – bass guitar (12)
Marietta Waters – backing vocals (10)
Greg Wells – Hammond organ (3)
Precious Wilson – backing vocals (16)
Stevie Wonder – arrangements, backing vocals and all instruments (9)
Tammy Wynette – vocals (7)
Paul Young – vocals (12)

Production
 Producers – Barry Beckett, P.M. Dawn, Stuart Epps, Don Henley, Elton John, Nik Kershaw, Steve Lindsey, George Michael, Giorgio Moroder, Greg Penny, Chris Rea, Chris Thomas, Don Was, Narada Michael Walden and Stevie Wonder.
 Associate Producer on "True Love" – Louis Biancaniello
 Executive Producers – Steve Brown, Ray Cooper and Elton John.
 Production Supervision – Greg Penny
 Production Coordination – Stephanie Andrews, Debra Johnson, Julie Larson, Janice Lee, Lisa Louie, Connie Pappas-Hillman, Cynthia Shiloh, Toby Taibi, Sam Stell and Kevin Walden.
 Engineers – Jim Champagne, Ed Cherney, Mark Evans, Mike Fossenkemper, David Frazer, Ron Jacobs, Jon Ingoldsby, Paul McKenna, David Nicholas, Csaba Petucz, Brian Reeves, Marc Reyburn, Matt Still, Gabe Veltri, Frank Wolf and Enrico De Paoli.
 Assistant Engineers – Van Arden, Dominick Barbera, Dan Bosworth, Jim Champagne, Todd Childress, Shaun de Ego, Jim DeMain, Billy Gabor, John Hendricksen, Amy Hughes, Steve Holroyd, Pete Lewis, Charles Paakkari, Thomas Rickert, Rail Jon Rogut, Brian Scheuble, Matt Still and Ben Wallach.
 Mixed by Van Arden, Ed Cherney, Mike Fossenkemper, David Frazer, Jon Ingoldsby and Bill Schnee.
 Mix Assistants – Dominick Barbera, Todd Childress, Steve Holroyd and Matt Still.
 Mix Consultant – Chris Lang
 Recorded at Ocean Way Recording, Conway Recording Studios and Capitol Studios (Hollywood, CA); A&M Studios and Wonderland Studios (Los Angeles, CA); Tarpan Studios (San Rafael, CA); Soundtrack Studios (New York City, NY); Bosstown Recording Studio (Atlanta, GA); Woodland Studio (Nashville, TN); Sol Studios (Cookham, Berkshire, UK), The Town House (London, UK), Olympic Studios (Barnes, West London) and Wembley Arena (Wembley Park, London).
 Mixed at Ocean Way Recording, Soundtrack Studios, A&M Studios, Tarpan Studios, Wonderland Studios, The Townhouse; Schnee Studio (North Hollywood, CA); Skip Saylor Recording (Los Angeles, CA); Record One (Sherman Oaks, CA); Metropolis Studios (Chiswick, West London).
 Digital Editing – Pete Fausone and R.R. Harlan
 Mastered by Chris Bellman at Bernie Grundman Mastering (Hollywood, CA).
 Photography – Brian Aris, Brad Branson, Mark Contratto, Paul Cox, Robert Goldstein, Stephen Harvey, Dominique Issermann, Harry Langdon, Sophie Muller, Hideo Odia, Albert Sanchez, Randee St. Nicholas, Allan Titmuss, Albert Watson and Firooz Zahedi.

Charts

Weekly charts

Year-end charts

Certifications

References

External links

1993 albums
Elton John albums
Vocal duet albums
Albums arranged by David Campbell (composer)
Albums produced by Don Was
Albums produced by Elton John
Albums produced by Chris Thomas (record producer)
Albums produced by Giorgio Moroder
Albums produced by Stevie Wonder
Albums produced by Narada Michael Walden
Albums recorded at Capitol Studios
Albums recorded at United Western Recorders
Albums recorded at A&M Studios
Albums recorded at Olympic Sound Studios
MCA Records albums
The Rocket Record Company albums
Albums recorded at Henson Recording Studios